Carfecillin is a beta-lactam antibiotic.  It is a phenyl derivative of carbenicillin, acting as a prodrug.

References 

Penicillins
Prodrugs